Persico Dosimo is a comune (municipality) in the Province of Cremona in the Italian region Lombardy, located about  southeast of Milan and about  northeast of Cremona.

Persico Dosimo borders the following municipalities: Castelverde, Corte de' Frati, Cremona, Gadesco-Pieve Delmona, Grontardo, Pozzaglio ed Uniti.

Among the local churches are:
 San Lorenzo, Quistro
 Santi Cosma e Damiano, Persico
 San Giovanni Battista Decollato, Dosimo

References

Cities and towns in Lombardy